The New York City Department of Education (NYCDOE) is the department of the government of New York City that manages the city's public school system. The City School District of the City of New York (or the New York City Public Schools) is the largest school system in the United States (and the world), with over 1.1 million students taught in more than 1,800 separate schools. The department covers all five boroughs of New York City, and has an annual budget of $38 billion. The department is run by the Panel for Educational Policy and New York City Schools Chancellor. The current chancellor is David C. Banks.

History 

The New York State legislature established the New York City Board of Education in 1842.

Beginning in the late 1960s, schools were grouped into districts. Elementary schools and middle schools were grouped into 32 community school districts, and high schools were grouped into five geographically larger districts. One each for Manhattan, the Bronx, Queens, one for most of Brooklyn, and one, BASIS, for the rest of Brooklyn and all of Staten Island. In addition, there were several special districts for alternative schools and schools serving severely disabled students.

On February 3, 1964, in protest over deplorable school conditions and segregation, over 450,000 students boycotted New York City public schools. In 1969, on the heels of additional protests, strikes, and demands for community control, New York City Mayor John Lindsay relinquished mayoral control of schools, and organized the city school system into the Board of Education (made up of seven members appointed by borough presidents and the mayor) and 32 community school boards (whose members were elected). Elementary and middle schools were controlled by the community boards while high schools were controlled by the Board of Education.

In 2002, the city's school system was reorganized by chapter 91 of the Laws of 2002. Control of the school system was given to the mayor, who began reorganization and reform efforts. The powers of the community school boards were diminished and the Board of Education was renamed the Panel for Educational Policy, a twelve-member body of which seven members are appointed by the mayor and five by Borough Presidents. Although that legislation itself made no specific reference to a "Department of Education of the City of New York", the bylaws subsequently adopted by the Board provided that the 13-member body "shall be known as the Panel for Educational Policy", which together with the Chancellor and other school employees was designated as the "Department of Education of the City of New York". The education headquarters were moved from 110 Livingston Street in downtown Brooklyn to the Tweed Courthouse building adjacent to New York City Hall in Manhattan.

In 2003, the districts were grouped into ten regions, each encompassing several elementary and middle school districts, and part of a high school district. In 2005, several schools joined the Autonomous Zone (later Empowerment Zone) and were allowed to use part of their budgets to directly purchase support services. These schools were released from their regions. In 2007, Mayor Michael Bloomberg and Chancellor Joel I. Klein announced the dissolution of the regions effective June 2007, and schools became organized into one of several School Support Organizations.

Due to an ongoing power struggle between the Democratic and Republican parties, state senators failed to renew mayoral control of the city's school system by 12:00 a.m. EDT on July 1, 2009, immediately ceding control back to the pre-2002 Board of Education system. Mayor Bloomberg announced summer school sessions would be held without interruption while city attorneys oversaw the transition of power. On August 6, 2009, the state senate ratified the bill returning control of the schools back to the mayor for another six years with few changes from the 2002-2009 mayoral control structure.

Since 2009, the NYS Assembly has passed incremental laws keeping NYC Mayoral control over the DOE and the current law is set to expire with the end of Mayor DeBlasio's term in 2022.

Management

Territory
NYCDOE is the school district of all five boroughs. All of the city is assigned to schools in the NYCDOE school district except for a small section of the Bronx, which is instead assigned to the Pelham Public Schools (with tuition supported by the city government).

Curriculum
Beginning in 2003, New York City public schools citywide implemented a mathematics "core curriculum" based on New York State standards for grades K-Up Higher. To graduate high school, students must earn at least six credits in mathematics. In order to receive a Regents diploma, students must score at least 65 on a Regents math exam.

Health and nutrition
The city has started several initiatives to reduce childhood obesity among students, including promoting exercise and improving nutrition in school cafeterias.

During Mayor Bloomberg's first term, white bread was entirely replaced with whole wheat bread, hot dog buns, and hamburger buns in cafeterias. In 2006, the city set out to eliminate whole milk from cafeteria lunch menus and took the further step of banning low-fat flavored milks, allowing only skim milk (white and chocolate). The New York City school system purchases more milk than any other in the United States. Although the dairy industry aggressively lobbied against the new plan they ultimately failed to prevent its implementation.

In October 2009, the DOE banned bake sales, though some schools continued to have them. The DOE cited the high sugar content of baked sale goods and that 40% of city students are obese. However, vending machines in the schools operated by Frito Lay and Snapple continued to sell high processed empty calorie foods such as Doritos and juices. As part of the DOE's program to create healthy diets among students, Frito Lay was obligated to put Reduced Fat Doritos in machines. The DOE considers Reduced Fat Doritos a healthy snack based on its June 2009 request for healthy snack vending machine proposals. However, the school lunch menu still contained numerous highly processed foods and high sugar content foods including chicken nuggets, French fries, French toast and syrup. This menu also continued to fail to meet the mandatory physical education requirements of the state. The New York State Assembly published a report that the NYCDOE failed to maintain or improve playgrounds, instead turning them into ad-hoc additional classroom space or parking lots.

In January 2011, the DOE began a pilot program called Connecting Adolescents to Comprehensive Health (CATCH) that offers some reproductive health services to students in grades 9–12. Services include providing access to birth control such as condoms, emergency contraceptives, and birth control pills. Starting with 13 high schools, it has grown to serve 90 high schools by 2022.

New York City began to offer free lunch to all students in 2017.

Teachers
In 1999, uncertified teachers filled an average of 10%, and as many as 27%, of the positions in the public school system. Beginning in 2000, after experiments with hiring uncertified teachers to fulfill a massive teacher shortage failed to produce acceptable results, and responding to pressure from the New York State Board of Regents and the No Child Left Behind Act, the DOE instituted a number of innovative programs for teacher recruitment, including the New York City Teaching Fellows, the TOP Scholars Program, and initiatives to bring foreign teachers (primarily from Eastern Europe) to teach in the city's schools. Housing subsidies are in place for experienced teachers who relocate to the city to teach.

In the course of school reorganizations, some veteran teachers have lost their positions. They then enter a pool of substitutes, called the Absent Teacher Reserve. On November 19, 2008, the department and the city's teacher union (the United Federation of Teachers), reached an agreement to create financial incentives for principals of new schools to hire ATR teachers and guidance counselors.

Budget
The one hundred largest school districts in the nation (by enrollment) spend an average of $14,000 per pupil every year. However, census data from 2017 shows that the NYCDOE easily placed first in the list, by spending $25,199. Only the Boston Public Schools came close to this figure.

$3 billion (15.6%) of the budget goes for the 19 percent of those who attend Non City schools. This includes $1.09 billion to pre-school special education services and $725.3 million for School-Age non DOE contract special education. Another $71 million goes to non public schools such as yeshivas and parochial schools and $1.04 billion is paid for the 70 thousand students attending charter schools. "In school year 2012-2013, 241,900 students attended nonpublic schools, 19 percent of the city K-12 total." The $1.04B for 70,000 students in charter schools calculates as $14,285; the $71 million for the 241,900 not in public school is less than $400 per student.

$4.6 billion of the budget pays for pensions and interest on Capital Plan debt.

Organization 

Although the 2002 reform legislation made no specific reference to a "Department of Education", the bylaws subsequently adopted by the New York City Board of Education provided that the board "shall be known as the Panel for Educational Policy", which together with the Chancellor and other school employees was designated as the "Department of Education of the City of New York".

New York City Panel for Educational Policy 

The Panel for Educational Policy has the authority to approve school closings. A majority of its membership is appointed by the Mayor.

Community Education Councils 
There are 32 councils, with 11 members on each, two appointed by Borough Presidents and nine selected by PTA leaders who are advised by parents who live in the council districts, the local parents acting through an election process conducted online and overseen by the Department of Education. The 2009 election cost $650,000 to conduct and another election was held in 2011.

According to Beth Fertig, Community Education Councils are "supposed to provide an avenue for parent engagement." According to Tim Kremer, head of the New York State School Boards Association, "although education councils don't have a lot of power they can play a vital role in vetting budgets and giving feedback on instructional policies." Councils have some veto power. The councils were created in 2002 and their authority was increased "a little" in 2009, but, according to Fertig, "many parents still claim the councils don't matter because decisions are ultimately controlled by the mayor." According to Soni Sangha, the councils are mainly obscure and unknown to many parents, their forums are not well-attended, and they meet with the citywide schools chancellor.

Student body

Demographics

In October 2018, 1,126,501 students attended New York City public schools, excluding 119,551 students enrolled in charter schools.

About 40% of students in the city's public school system live in households where a language other than English is spoken; one-third of all New Yorkers were born in another country. The city's Department of Education translates report cards, registration forms, system-wide alerts, and documents on health and policy initiatives for parents into Spanish, French, German, Russian, Chinese, Japanese, Korean, Hindi, Telugu, Bengali, Urdu, Persian, Arabic, and Haitian Creole.

In October 2018, the student population was 42% Hispanic and Latino, 26% African American, 15% Non-Hispanic White, and 16% Asian American. Another 3% were of multiple race categories. Of the students, 20% were disabled, 13% were English language learners, and 73% met the department's definition of poverty.

The specialized high schools tend to be disproportionately Asian. New York's Specialized High School Institute is an after-school program for students in late middle school. It was designed to enlarge the pool of African American and Hispanic candidates eligible for admission to the selective schools by giving them extra lessons and teaching test-taking skills. Unlike other urban school districts (such as San Francisco Unified School District), New York does not use racial preferences (affirmative action) in public school admissions. The School Diversity Advisory Group has recommended that race and socioeconomic status, rather than student aptitude, be the prime considerations in school admissions.

In May 2012, the New York Times reported that New York City had the fifth most segregated large city school system, after Chicago and Dallas. Hispanic students are concentrated in Washington Heights and Corona and the greatest segregation existed in black neighborhoods. It further noted that black isolation in schools has persisted even as residential segregation has declined. , the Times said that 11% of the schools in the city system had the majority of non-Hispanic white students, who made up 15% of the system's total student body. In May 2017, the Times published another report in collaboration with Measure of America that examined the effects of segregation. According to the report, black and Hispanic students were more likely to attend nonselective schools with majority-black and Hispanic demographics and lower graduation rates, while white and Asian students were more likely to attend selective or zoned schools with higher graduation rates. The Times also stated that zoned schools with majority white or Asian demographics tended to have higher graduation rates than zoned schools with majority black or Hispanic demographics. While the universal high school choice policy in New York City sought to weaken the link between the conditions in students neighborhoods and their educational outcomes, a 2016 report by Measure of America found that on-time graduation rates still vary immensely by where students lived.

Alumni
After graduating from high school or leaving the New York City public school system, a number of New York City public school students have gone on to become celebrities, and leaders in various industries including music, fashion, business, sports, and entertainment. Some of the most notable New York City public school alumni include Ruth Bader Ginsburg, Alicia Keys, Stanley Kubrick, Al Pacino, Colin Powell, Lloyd Blankfein, Neil deGrasse Tyson (K - 12), and Jay-Z.

Unsurprisingly, art focused schools, including High School of Art and Design and Fiorello H. LaGuardia High School have tended to produce notable artists,  actors, and fashion over the past century, while STEM focused schools, including Stuyvesant High School and Bronx High School of Science boast Nobel Prize winners and scientists among their notable alumni.

Many now famous alumni also interacted with one another while attending public school together. One particular vocational high school, George Westinghouse Career and Technical Education High School, is widely known in Brooklyn to have helped produce four rap legends. In the 1990s, Jay-Z, Busta Rhymes, DMX, and The Notorious B.I.G. all attended the same school. Similarly, at DeWitt Clinton High School in The Bronx, famed novelist James Baldwin and photographer Richard Avedon both contributed to their school's literary magazine, The Magpie, in the 1930s.

Infrastructure

School buildings
Many school buildings are architecturally noteworthy, in part due to the efforts of C. B. J. Snyder. Since 1988 construction has been in the hands of the New York City School Construction Authority.

Most schools were built prior to the passage of the Americans with Disabilities Act and are not accessibile or only partially accessible to people with physical disabilities. The Office of Accessibility Planning, which is located within the Office of Space Management, collaborates with other offices within the DOE to facilitate projects that specifically focus on improving the accessibility of school buildings.

Every school building is given an accessibility designation of either, No Accessibility, Partially Accessible or Fully Accessible, which is listed on the school's profile. In addition, schools are given an accessibility rating from a scale of 1–10. All buildings built on or after 1992 are fully accessible and are given a 10 out of 10 rating. Students with physical disabilities get priority admission to fully or partially accessible schools.

The department has closed many failing elementary, middle (intermediate) and high schools. The buildings of some of the larger schools have been turned into "Campuses" or "Complexes" in which a number of smaller school entities, educationally independent of each other, co-exist within the building.

Radio and television stations
The Board operated radio station WNYE beginning in 1938, from studios located within the campus of Brooklyn Technical High School. Television station WNYE-TV went on the air in 1967, with its studios adjacent to George Westinghouse High School in Downtown Brooklyn. The broadcast licenses of both stations were transferred to the Department of Information Technology and Telecommunications in 2004.

Analysis and criticism 
New York is one of ten major U.S. cities in which the educational system is under the control of the mayor rather than an elected school board.

More recently, Mayor Bill de Blasio has received major criticism over his decision to accept proposals by charter schools to co-locate with public schools, specifically Seth Low IS and Cavallaro IS in Bensonhurst, Brooklyn. Many people expressed shock and disappointment at the decision, claiming that co-location leads to congestion of school streets, overcrowded classrooms, strained resources, and a negative impact on children's education.

Mayoral control status 
Mayor de Blasio retains control over the New York City Public Schools, due to state lawmakers granting two one year extensions, currently valid through the end of June 2022.
The deal includes provisions which require release of more detailed budget information about the New York City schools, according to information sent out by Governor Andrew Cuomo's office. Lawmakers also agreed to give districts until the end of the year to negotiate details of new evaluation systems for teachers and principals. The deal also will allow charter schools to more easily switch between authorizers. That could mean the city's education department, which oversees a number of charter schools (but which no longer accepts oversight of new schools) could see some of these schools depart in the future for oversight by State University of New York or the New York State Education Department.

Bullying lawsuit 
In April 2016, a group of 11 students and their families along with the non-profit organization Families for Excellent Schools, filed a federal class action lawsuit against the NYCDOE and Chancellor Farina, alleging that the department did not do enough to prevent bullying in schools. The basis of the suit claimed that the atmosphere inside New York City public schools was depriving students of their right to receive an education free of violence, bullying and harassment.  In March 2018, the NYCDOE agreed to settle under the condition that it was required to report bullying incidents into an electronic system within one day, and that parents would also be able to submit school bullying complaints electronically.

Size
"It is bigger by half than the second-largest system, Los Angeles, and twice as large as Chicago, the third-largest." To give this context, City Journal reported that "a separate Brooklyn district would itself be the fourth-largest in the country."

Drag Queen Story Hour
The New York City Department of Education was criticized for its inclusion of Drag Queen Story Hour after it was revealed that $200,000 in taxpayer money was used for the program. City Council member Vickie Paladino was amongst those who spoke out against the program and was later criticized for her comments by mayor Eric Adams.

See also

 Council of School Supervisors & Administrators
 Insideschools.org
 List of high schools in New York City
 List of public elementary schools in New York City
 New York State Education Department
 Public Schools Athletic League
 School of One
 University of the State of New York
 Waiting for "Superman"
 New York City Schools Chancellor(includes List of New York City Schools Chancellors)

References 
https://www.schools.nyc.gov/about-us/reports/doe-data-at-a-glance

Further reading 
 Carolan, Brian V. "Institutional Pressures and Isomorphic Change: The Case of New York City's Department of Education". (academic journal article, see entry in ERIC) Education and Urban Society (ISSN 0013-1245). 2008, Volume 40, Issue 428. Originally published online on October 23, 2007. . pp. 428–451.
  Hanawa, Takeo (塙 武郎 Hanawa Takeo) "The Fiscal Structure and Features of Public Elementary and Secondary Education of the City of New York(<Featured Theme>American model of Welfare State)." (ニューヨーク市初等中等教育の財政構造と特質(<特集>アメリカ・モデルの福祉国家) ; Archive) Journal of Social Science (社會科學研究). University of Tokyo. March 2008. Volume 59, Issue 5/6. p. 163-184.
 English abstract and information about the Hanawa journal article - Japanese information page
 Hetherman, Stephen Crowe. An application of multi-faceted Rasch measurement to monitor effectiveness of the written composition in English in the New York City Department of Education (dissertation). Columbia University Teachers College, ProQuest, UMI Dissertations Publishing, May 17, 2004. UMI Number 3135342.
 Howell, Fanon John (:en:New School University). Accountable Choice: Governance, Evaluation, and Culture in the New York City Department of Education (dissertation). ProQuest, UMI Dissertations Publishing, August 2010 (ProQuest publishing date: 2011). UMI Number: 3458102.
 Iatarola, Patrice (Florida State University) and Amy Ellen Schwartz, Leanna Stieffel, and Colin C. Chellman (New York University). "Small Schools, Large Districts: Small-School Reform and New York City's Students" (Archive). Teachers College Record. Teachers College, Columbia University, September 2008. Volume 110, Number 9, pp. 1837–1878. .

External links 

 New York City Department of Education
 NYCDOE Office of School Support Services
NYC DOE Email
 New York City Board of Education/New York City Department of Education (Archive)
 Archives in 1998
 NYCDOE school zoning information
 NYC School Zones: alternative zoning information website
 New York School Boycott, Civil Rights Digital Library



 
School districts in New York (state)
Public education in New York City
School districts established in 2002
Government agencies established in 2002
2002 establishments in New York City